Rhode aspinifera is a genus of Slovenian woodlouse spider, found primarily within caves.

Description
Mature males have a total length of 3.3–3.4 mm, and females a total length of 3.8–4.6 mm. The carapace and sternum are reddish-brown in colour. A dorsal and a ventral scutum cover almost all of the abdomen. The promargin of the chelicerae has three teeth, and the retromargin has a single denticle. The eyes are completely absent, as their primary habitat is inside caves. The legs are covered in hair, especially on the ventral side of the metatarsi.

References

Dysderidae
Spiders of Europe
Spiders described in 1963
 Cave spiders